Barabajagal is the seventh studio album and eighth album overall from British singer-songwriter Donovan. It was released in the United States on 11 August 1969 (Epic Records BN 26481 (stereo)), but was not released in the United Kingdom because of a continuing contractual dispute that also prevented Sunshine Superman, Mellow Yellow, and The Hurdy Gurdy Man from being released in the UK.

History
While the majority of the Barabajagal sessions took place in November 1968, "Happiness Runs" and "Where Is She" were recorded the previous May. All of these songs except "Atlantis", "I Love My Shirt" and "To Susan on the West Coast Waiting" were shelved while Donovan's Greatest Hits was still high in the charts. "Atlantis" / "I Love My Shirt" was released as a single in November 1968 in the UK. In the US, "To Susan on the West Coast Waiting" / "Atlantis" was released in March 1969. "Atlantis" ended up charting higher than its a-side. Some of the songs recorded were originally meant to be included on the unreleased Moon in Capricorn album.

In May 1969, Mickie Most produced at least one session with Donovan fronting the Jeff Beck Group. "Goo Goo Barabajagal (Love Is Hot)" (also known as "Barabajagal (Love Is Hot)" and simply "Barabajagal") and "Trudi" (originally "Bed with Me") resulted from these sessions. There were other songs recorded by Donovan and the Jeff Beck Group, but they remained unreleased until they appeared as bonus tracks on the 2005 UK reissue of the album. Rod Stewart was in the band at this time, but he does not sing lead on any of the songs that were released. Tony Newman is featured as drummer.

"Goo Goo Barabajagal (Love Is Hot)" / "Trudi" was released as a single in June 1969 in the UK and in August 1969 in the United States. Following the pattern of Donovan's previous releases, his next album was named after the hit single of the time. The inclusion of "Atlantis" and "To Susan on the West Coast Waiting" helped make Barabajagal a strong seller in the United States.

The songs on this album represent all facets of Donovan's career. Several rockers adorn the album, including the title track, "Trudi", "The Love Song" and "Superlungs (My Supergirl)". "I Love My Shirt" updates the sound of Donovan's children's music, and there are several slow songs featuring breathy vocals ("Where Is She?", "To Susan on the West Coast Waiting") reminiscent of the For Little Ones portion of A Gift from a Flower to a Garden. It is during the Barabajagal sessions that Donovan's musical vision and work ethic began to diverge from that of producer Mickie Most. The two eventually stopped working together, effectively ending Donovan's chart success.

"Happiness Runs" is a round sung by Donovan, Graham Nash, Michael McCartney, and Lesley Duncan and was originally released without the round as "Pebble and the Man" on Donovan in Concert. "Superlungs (My Supergirl)" was originally recorded during the Sunshine Superman sessions, but was not used for that album. That recording was released on Troubadour: The Definitive Collection 1964–1976. Donovan re-recorded the song for Barabajagal.

Reissues
On 25 October 1990, Epic Records reissued Barabajagal (Epic 26481), in the US on CD.
On 16 May 2005, EMI reissued Barabajagal (EMI 8735692), in the UK on CD, with thirteen bonus tracks.
On 1 October 2018, The state51 Conspiracy reissued Barabajagal (CON236LP), in the UK and Ireland, on 180 gram vinyl.

Track listing

Original album

2005 EMI version (UK) bonus tracks
"Stromberg Twins" – 4:40
"Snakeskin" – 2:41
"Lauretta's Cousin Laurinda" – 4:18
"The Swan (Lord of the Reedy River)" – 3:08
"Poor Man's Sunshine (Nativity)" – 5:19
"New Year's Resolution (Donovan's Celtic Jam)" – 3:16
"Runaway" (demo) – 3:03
"Sweet Beverley" (demo) – 2:59
"Marjorie (Margarine)" (demo) – 3:17
"Little White Flower" (demo) – 2:09
"Good Morning Mr. Wind" (demo) – 2:08
"Palais Girl" (demo) – 2:26
"Lord of the Universe" (demo) – 3:12

Personnel

London

 Donovan – guitar, harmonica, vocals
 Jeff Beck, Big Jim Sullivan, Ronnie Wood – guitar
 John Paul Jones, Danny Thompson – bass guitar
 Madeline Bell – backing vocals
 Tony Carr – percussion, drums
 Lesley Duncan – backing vocals
 Aynsley Dunbar – drums
 Alan Hawkshaw – piano
 Nicky Hopkins – keyboards
 Harold McNair – flute
 Rod Stewart – backing vocals
 Mickie Most – producer

Los Angeles
The following musicians played on "I Love My Shirt", "To Susan on the West Coast Waiting", "Atlantis" and "Pamela Jo":

 James Kehn – percussion, drums
 Gabriel Mekler – keyboards
 Richie Podolor – producer

References

External links
 Barabajagal – Donovan Unofficial Site

 Barabajagal (Adobe Flash) at Myspace (streamed copy where licensed)

Donovan albums
1969 albums
Epic Records albums
Albums produced by Mickie Most
Albums recorded at Olympic Sound Studios